Ispi may refer to:

 The Iranian city Esfid, also known as Ispi
 The Institute for International Political Studies, an Italian think tank